Namkha or Ban Namkha is a village in Pha Oudom District in Bokeo Province of northwestern Laos.
It is the oldest village in the district, established in 1906 by the Lao Lom people.

References

Populated places in Bokeo Province